Tropaeolin is the retained name for some azo dyes from the industrially applied group of acid dyes used as pH indicators. The name is derived from the botanical name Tropaeolum for nasturtiums.

Examples for Tropaeolin dyes

References 

Azo dyes
Benzenesulfonates
Acid dyes